The 2008 United States Senate election in Illinois was held on November 4, 2008. Incumbent Democratic U.S. Senator Dick Durbin sought a third term in office and faced minimal opposition from Republican Steve Sauerberg. As expected, Durbin overwhelmingly won re-election. On the same night, fellow Democratic Senator Barack Obama was elected President of the United States, defeating Republican Senator John McCain of Arizona.

Election information
The primaries and general elections coincided with those for other federal elections (United States President and House), as well as those for state offices.

Turnout

For the primary elections, turnout was 32.37%, with 2,364,409 votes cast. For the general election, turnout was 68.42%, with 5,329,884 votes cast.

Democratic primary

Candidates 
 Dick Durbin, incumbent U.S. Senator

Results

Republican primary

Candidates 
 Steve Sauerberg, physician
 Andy Martin, perennial candidate
 Mike Psak, trucker and perennial candidate

Results

General election

Predictions

Results 
Durbin's 3,615,844 votes is the highest vote total in a statewide election in Illinois. No one has broken his record since, however then Vice President Joe Biden received the most votes in the presidential election in Illinois in 2020.
Durbin comfortably won re-election with the best margin of his career, winning all but four of the state's 102 counties.

See also 
 2008 United States Senate elections

References

External links 
 Illinois State Board of Elections
 U.S. Congress candidates for Illinois at Project Vote Smart
 Illinois, U.S. Senate from CQ Politics
 Illinois U.S. Senate from OurCampaigns.com
 Illinois U.S. Senate race from 2008 Race Tracker
 Campaign contributions for Illinois congressional races from OpenSecrets
 Official campaign websites (Archived)
 Dick Durbin, Democratic incumbent nominee
 Steve Sauerberg, Republican nominee
 Larry Stafford, Libertarian nominee
 Kathy Cummings, Green Party nominee
 Chad Koppie, Constitution nominee

2008
Illinois
United States Senate